Infanta Ana de Jesus Maria of Braganza (Mafra, 23 October 1806 – Rome, 22 June 1857) was a Portuguese infanta and youngest daughter of King John VI and his wife, Carlota Joaquina of Spain.

Life 

On 5 December 1827, she married Dom Nuno José Severo de Mendonça Rolim de Moura Barreto, then Marquis of Loulé and Count of Vale de Reis, future Duke of Loulé. Subsequently, he served several times as Prime Minister of Portugal. The wedding was celebrated in a private ceremony in the chapel of the Royal Ajuda Palace and was a scandal at the time. Although Loulé was a nobleman and remote descendant of Portugal's royal dynasty, Dona Ana de Jesus was the first infanta of Portugal since the Middle Ages to marry a man who was not of royal rank.

The reasons for the marriage were probably not political, considering the couple's first child was born on 27 December 1827, twenty-two days after the ceremony. The marriage had not been approved by D. Ana's father, King John VI, prior to his death (strictly, Portuguese law at the time only stated that the marriage of the heir presumptive required the sovereign's consent, a position D. Ana never held). Nor were either of her brothers present in the country at the time of the wedding (both claimed the kingship from abroad).

The designated regent of the kingdom was D. Ana's elder sister, Infanta Isabel Maria of Braganza, who was present in Lisbon. The marriage was not an elopement, as the royal family was aware of the couple's intention to marry and D. Ana's mother facilitated rather than sought to prevent the marriage before her daughter gave birth.

With the restoration of absolutism in Portugal in 1831 the couple was exiled and began extended travel through Europe. They had several other children abroad. The marriage ended with a de facto separation in 1835. The infanta died before her husband was created a duke.

D. Ana's heir, and the head of the Loulé ducal line is her great-great-great-grandson D. Pedro Folque de Mendoça Rolim de Moura Barreto, 6th Duke of Loulé. He is considered by some to be the rightful pretender to the defunct Portuguese throne by virtue of his ancestors' uninterrupted domicile on Portuguese soil.

Issue 
D. Ana Carlota de Mendóça Rolim de Moura Barreto, later Countess of Linhares
D. Maria do Carmo de Mendóça Rolim de Moura Barreto, later Countess of Belmonte
D. Pedro José de Mendóça Rolim de Moura Barreto, later 2nd Duke of Loulé
D. Maria Amália de Mendóça Rolim de Moura Barreto
D. Augusto Pedro de Mendóça Rolim de Moura Barreto, later 3rd Count of Azambuja

Nuno da Câmara Pereira, a member of the People's Monarchist Party (PPM) in the Assembly of the Republic, descends from D. Ana. He promotes restoration of the monarchy under the House of Loulé.

See also 
Descendants of John VI of Portugal

Ancestry

References 

Portuguese infantas
House of Braganza
1806 births
1857 deaths
19th-century Portuguese people
19th-century Portuguese women
Knights of the Order of the Immaculate Conception of Vila Viçosa
Knights Grand Cross of the Order of the Immaculate Conception of Vila Viçosa
Dames of the Order of Saint Isabel
Spouses of prime ministers of Portugal
Daughters of kings